Oh, Grandmother's Dead is a 1969 Italian comedy film directed by Mario Monicelli and starring Sergio Tofano.

Cast
 Sirena Adgemova as Sparta
 Carole André as Claretta
 Wanda Capodaglio as Adelaide Ghia, the grandmother
 Peter Chatel as Guido
 Valentina Cortese as Ornella
 Giuseppina Cozzi
 Luigi De Vittorio as Don Mario
 Riccardo Garrone as Galeazzo
 Vera Gherarducci as Gigliola
 Ray Lovelock as Carlo Alberto
 Gastone Pescucci as Adolfo
 Giorgio Piazza as Italo
 Helena Ronee as Titina
 Gianni Scolari as Carlo Maria
 Sergio Tofano as the grandfather

References

External links

1969 films
1960s black comedy films
1960s Italian-language films
Films directed by Mario Monicelli
Italian black comedy films
1969 comedy films
1969 drama films
1960s Italian films